Gödeke Michels (Low Saxon; died 1402), also known as Gottfried Michaelsen in High German, was a German pirate and one of the leaders of the Likedeeler, a combination of former Vitalienbrüder.

Early life

Career
Together with Klaus Störtebeker, Hennig Wichmann and Magister Wigbold, as well as other leaders of the Likedeeler, he raided shipping in the North and Baltic Sea near the end of the 14th century.

They possessed fast ships, which easily outmaneuvered the ships of the Hanse. Like many of the Likedeeler, Michels was primarily concerned with capturing valuable prizes. However, he disdained cowardice and those surviving crewmen who had not resisted were usually thrown overboard.

Death 
Gottfried Michaelsen was eventually captured and executed in the year 1402, shortly after Klaus Störtebeker and crewmen were beheaded on the Grasbrook in Hamburg.

References 
 Jörgen Bracker, "Klaus Störtebeker – nur einer von ihnen. Die Geschichte der Vitalienbrüder", in: Störtebeker. 600 Jahre nach seinem Tod, Wilfried Ehbrecht (ed.), Lübeck: Porta-Alba-Verlag, 2001, (=Hansische Studien; vol. 15), .

External links 
 Gottes Freund – Aller Welt Feind 

1402 deaths
14th-century births
German pirates
People executed in the Holy Roman Empire by decapitation
Executed German people
15th-century executions
Medieval pirates